Phuntshothang Gewog (Dzongkha: ཕུན་ཚོགས་ཐང་) is a gewog (village block) of Samdrup Jongkhar District, Bhutan. Phuntshothang and Pemathang Gewogs comprise Samdrup Choling Dungkhag (sub-district).

References

Gewogs of Bhutan
Samdrup Jongkhar District